Tinsel Dome is a small ice-covered hill, 700 m, standing between Aureole Hills and Bone Bay on Trinity Peninsula. Charted in 1948 by the Falkland Islands Dependencies Survey (FIDS) who gave this descriptive name.

Map
 Trinity Peninsula. Scale 1:250000 topographic map No. 5697. Institut für Angewandte Geodäsie and British Antarctic Survey, 1996.

References
 SCAR Composite Antarctic Gazetteer.

Ice caps of Antarctica
Bodies of ice of Graham Land
Landforms of Trinity Peninsula